Anthony Carelli is an American poet. He won a Whiting Award.

Life
He grew up in Poynette, Wisconsin.
He graduated from University of Wisconsin–Madison, and from New York University.
He teaches at New York University.
He works in Brooklyn.
His work appeared in AGNI, and The New Yorker.

Works

References

External links
https://web.archive.org/web/20120530073630/http://www.failbetter.com/newsandnotes/wordpress/?p=966
http://patch.com/new-york/windsorterrace/5-questions-for-poet-anthony-carelli

1979 births
Living people
People from Poynette, Wisconsin
Writers from Brooklyn
Poets from Wisconsin
University of Wisconsin–Madison alumni
New York University alumni
New York University faculty
American male poets
21st-century American poets
21st-century American male writers